Jaggard is a surname, and may refer to:

 Edwin Jaggard (born 1942), Australian academic
 Edwin A. Jaggard (1859-1911), American jurist
 William Jaggard (circa 1568 – 1623), English printer

See also
 Michelle Jaggard-Lai (born 1969), a retired Australian tennis player
 Jagger